Mont Panié is a mountain on the island of Grande Terre in New Caledonia, a special collectivity of France located in the south-west Pacific Ocean. At , it is the island's highest point. Mont Panié is situated in the Chaîne Centrale mountain range.

Environment
The eastern slopes of the mountain descend directly and steeply to the sea. On the western side are the upper valleys of the Diahot and Ulaeeum Rivers. Above 700 m the vegetation is dominated by dayu biik forest; farther down, between 700 and 300 m, there is a transition zone characterised by niaouli, followed by savannas and anthropogenic areas. The mountain's forests are home to 13 species of palms, three of which are endemic to the massif.

Important Bird Area
The Panié massif has been recognised as an Important Bird Area (IBA) by BirdLife International because it supports populations of New Caledonian imperial pigeons, cloven-feathered doves, white-bellied goshawks, horned parakeets, grey-eared honeyeaters, crow honeyeaters, New Caledonian friarbirds, New Caledonian myzomelas, barred honeyeaters, fan-tailed gerygones, New Caledonian whistlers, South Melanesian cuckooshrikes, New Caledonian cicadabirds, long-tailed trillers, streaked fantails, Melanesian flycatchers, southern shrikebills, New Caledonian crows, yellow-bellied robins, New Caledonian thicketbirds, green-backed white-eyes, striated starlings and red-throated parrotfinches. There is also a small breeding colony of Tahiti petrels.

See also
 List of Ultras of Oceania
 List of islands by highest point

References

External links 
 "Mont Panié, New Caledonia" on Peakbagger

Panie
Important Bird Areas of New Caledonia
Seabird colonies